The Dictionary of Old English (DOE) is a dictionary of the Old English language, published by the Centre for Medieval Studies, University of Toronto, under the direction of Angus Cameron, Ashley Crandell Amos, Antonette diPaolo Healey, and Haruko Momma. It complements the Oxford English Dictionarys comprehensive survey of modern English, the Middle English Dictionarys comprehensive survey of Middle English, and the Scottish Language Dictionaries surveys of Scots.

The dictionary is still under production. With the publication of the entries under I in September 2018, the entries for letters A-I of the 24-letter Old English alphabet have been published (though since the dictionary has no entry for J and published the two entries for K at the same time as the I entries, it has technically covered A-K, and the next letter to be published will be L).

The dictionary has made extensive use of digital technology, and is based on a corpus of at least one copy of every known surviving text written in Old English.

History 

The dictionary was conceived in 1968 as a replacement for the Bosworth–Toller Anglo-Saxon Dictionary, which had been compiled at a time when both the study of the Old English language and lexicographical techniques were less advanced. From the outset, the editors were interested in the potential application of computer technology to the task of compiling the dictionary, and in basing the dictionary text on a corpus. A dictionary plan was published in 1973. It was originally anticipated that work on the dictionary would begin in 1976 and the dictionary would begin appearing in fascicles shortly thereafter.

The first fascicle was not published until 1986, and covered words beginning with the letter D. The letter G was reached in 2008.  the entries for 8 of the 24 letters of the Old English alphabet, A-H were published, with over 60% of the total entries written. The letter I was released in September 2018.

Availability

The dictionary is available in 3 formats:
 Dictionary of Old English: A to I online This site offers a limited number of free searches per year, then charges apply. Registration is required.
 Dictionary of Old English: A to H on CD-ROM
 Dictionary of Old English: A to G on microfiche
The corpus is available in 2 formats:
 Dictionary of Old English Web Corpus
 Dictionary of Old English in Electronic Form

The computerized corpus (old version) is available to download on request from the University of Oxford Text Archive, free for use in education and research:
 Dictionary of Old English Corpus in Electronic Form (DOEC)

Notes

External links
Official website
An animated clip highlighting Old English and the DOE
A clip created by University of Toronto featuring editors and students
In memory of Angus Cameron
Put Your Own Stamp on the Dictionary of Old English

Old English dictionaries